Joshuan's Almanac & Book of Facts is an accessory for the Dungeons & Dragons fantasy role-playing game, published in 1995.

Contents
Joshuan's Almanac & Book of Facts aims to give player characters hints about the world of Mystara. The Almanac is written in the character of the halfling Joshuan Gallidox and several correspondents, and describes the world kingdom by kingdom, introduces famous people, discusses miscellanea about Mystara, explores some history, details events for the year 1013, shares some predictions, and even carries classified ads.

Publication history
Joshuan's Almanac & Book of Facts featured design by Ann Dupuis and Elizabeth Thornabene, and was published by TSR in 1995. Cover art is by Alan Pollack, with interior art by David O. Miller.

Reception
Trenton Webb reviewed Joshuan's Almanac & Book of Facts for Arcane magazine, rating it a 4 out of 10 overall. He called the book "More of a Hitchhiker's Guide than an Encyclopædia Galactica". He felt that the trouble with the book was that "like its eponymous publisher, it's a jack of all trades. It's an admirable attempt to lay a foundation on which future campaigns can be built, and it delivers some strong ideas, but these are strangled by the nature of Mystara, the book's pedantic format and its being written in character." As a result, he considers the book "a fitful work", noting that Mystara, "a traditional Tolkienesque world" is here portrayed as "sickly sweet and packed to the gills with jolly, close harmony singing folk with big feet". He felt that the geographical descriptions "form a 100-page log jame, while the correspondents' characters have all the charm of daytime TV presenters". He recommended that if players are currently using Mystara as their world, then it might be worth the price, but if not then he advised, "don't panic - it's mostly harmless".

References

Mystara
Role-playing game supplements introduced in 1995